The men's shot put event at the 2017 Summer Universiade was held on 23 August at the Taipei Municipal Stadium.

Medalists

Results

Qualification
Qualification: 19.50 m (Q) or at least 12 best (q) qualified for the final.

Final

References

Shot put
2017